Muddy Creek is a stream in central Utah, United States, that drains portions of Emery, Sanpete, Sevier, and Wayne counties.

Description
The creek begins on the eastern slopes of the Wasatch Plateau at elevations above . It turns southward near the town of Emery, then southeastward, where it crosses under Interstate 70. It then directly enters the western flank of the San Rafael Swell and continuing in a southeasterly direction, it passes Hondu Arch, and the Tomsich Butte mining area then begins its spectacular passage through a narrow slot canyon of Coconino Sandstone known as the "Chute".

After merging with Chimney Canyon and passing the Hidden Splendor Mine area, it passes through the southeastern escarpment of the San Rafael Reef at the end of Muddy Creek Gorge. In its lower reaches, it continues southeastward through the Blue Hills badlands near Caineville, then cuts through the  Jurassic Morrison Formation where dinosaur fossils have been found.

Since it enters the San Rafael Swell at an elevation well below that attained by the Swell itself and continues through the Swell's entire expanse, Muddy Creek is a very ancient river course, "superimposed" on the entire San Rafael uplift and therefore predating the time when the latter arose some 60-40 million years ago.

Wilderness
Designated in 2019 by the U.S. Congress, the Muddy Creek Wilderness encompasses the pristine portion of the creek that enters the San Rafael Swell.  The 98,023 acres wilderness area is managed by the U.S. Bureau of Land Management.

See also

 List of Utah rivers
 List of tributaries of the Colorado River
 Quitchupah Creek
 List of U.S. Wilderness Areas

References

External links

 Muddy Creek WSA at Bureau of Land Management 
 River Information:
 River and Rafting Information
 Hiking the Gorge of Muddy Creek
 Flow Gauge at Emery, Utah

Rivers of Utah
Rivers of Emery County, Utah
San Rafael Swell
Rivers of Wayne County, Utah
Tributaries of the Colorado River in Utah
Former rivers
Wilderness areas of Utah